"Pat" is a studio album by Pat Boone, released in 1957 on Dot Records.

In his retrospective review for AllMusic, Arthur Rowe gave the album 2.5 stars out of 5, opining that it was a "bad album" that might "have gone some distance toward derailing [Pat Boone's] career early on, if he "had not gotten off to a fast start with some good, energy-charged [...] rock & roll and also an excellent [...] album of standards".

Track listing

References 

1957 albums
Pat Boone albums
Dot Records albums